Twice Removed is the second album by Canadian rock band Sloan, released on Geffen Records in 1994. The album took seven weeks and cost $120,000 to record.  More melodic than their previous album, Smeared, Geffen gave the record little promotion because it defied the label's commercially dominant grunge rock style of the time. The band and Geffen parted ways after Twice Removeds release. After the band's trouble with the label, they took time off from touring and writing and were broken up for a brief period.

Commercial performance
Twice Removed peaked at No. 25 on the RPM Canadian Albums Chart. By February 1997, the album had sold 58,000 units in Canada. The album was certified Gold in Canada on October 20, 1998.

Legacy
In 1996, the music magazine Chart conducted a reader poll to determine the best Canadian albums of all time. Twice Removed topped that poll. When the magazine conducted a follow up poll in 2000, Twice Removed lost the top spot to Joni Mitchell's Blue, but still placed third. In the third poll, in 2005, Twice Removed reclaimed the top spot.

It was also ranked fourteenth  in Bob Mersereau's 2007 book The Top 100 Canadian Albums.

In 2012, the album received a deluxe reissue on vinyl. This edition includes another three discs: one containing demo versions of the Twice Removed songs; another containing B-sides that were originally intended for the album but left off; and a 7-inch, 45 RPM disc containing songs that, in the words of guitarist Jay Ferguson, "didn't really fit anywhere else in the package". The release also includes a 12x12, 32-page colour booklet containing photos, interviews and other stories from the band's members. The reissue was made available exclusively via the band's website.

In 2015, the album was named the winner in the 1990s category of the inaugural Slaight Family Polaris Heritage Prize, an annual Canadian music award for classic albums released prior to the creation of the Polaris Music Prize.

Track listing
All songs credited to Sloan.Japanese Bonus TracksB-Sides'''
 "Coax Me (Icks Nay on the Evie Stay Micks)" (Coax Me 7")
 "One Professional Care" (Coax Me 7")
 "I Can Feel It (demo)" (promo 7")

Trivia
Jennifer Pierce from Jale appears once again as a backup singer on "I Can Feel It".
Lyrics for the first track on the album, "Penpals", were taken from broken English fan letters to Kurt Cobain, which the band rummaged through when they were signed to Geffen in the early ’90s.

"Penpals" is referenced in the graphic novel Lost at Sea'' by Bryan Lee O'Malley when one character sings the lyrics from it.

References

1994 albums
Sloan (band) albums
Geffen Records albums